Listed below are the UCI Women's Teams that compete in 2013 women's road cycling events organized by the International Cycling Union (UCI), including the 2013 UCI Women's Road World Cup.

Teams overview
The country designation of each team is determined by the country of registration of the largest number of its riders, and is not necessarily the country where the team is registered or based.

List updated 4 August 2013

Riders

BePink

As of April 2013.

Bizkaia–Durango

Ages as of 1 January 2013.

Boels–Dolmans Cycling Team

As of 1 January 2013. Ages as of 1 January 2013.

Bourgogne–Pro Dialog

Ages as of 1 January 2013.

China Chongming–Giant Pro Cycling
Ages as of 1 January 2013.

Chirio Forno d'Asolo

Ages as of 1 January 2013.

Cramo Go:green

Ages as of 1 January 2013.

Cyclelive Plus–Zannata

Ages as of 1 January 2013.

Exergy TWENTY16

Ages as of 1 January 2013.

Faren Kuota

Ages as of 1 January 2013.

GSD Gestion-Kallisto

Ages as of 1 January 2013.

Hitec Products UCK

As of 1 January 2013

Lointek

Ages as of 1 January 2013.

Lotto–Belisol Ladies

Ages as of 1 January 2013.

MCipollini–Giordana

Ages as of 1 January 2013.

Optum p/b Kelly Benefit Strategies

Orica–AIS

Pasta Zara–Cogeas

Rabo Women Cycling Team

RusVelo

Ages as of 1 January 2013.

S.C. Michela Fanini-Rox

Ages as of 1 January 2013.

Sengers Ladies Cycling Team

Ages as of 1 January 2013.

Servetto Footon

Ages as of 1 January 2013.

Specialized–lululemon

As of 1 January 2013. Ages as of 1 January 2013. 

Source

Squadra Scappatella

Ages as of 1 January 2013.

Team Argos–Shimano

Ages as of 1 January 2013.

Team Futurumshop.nl
Ages as of 1 January 2013.

Team Pratomagno Women

Ages as of 1 January 2013.

Team TIBCO–To The Top

As of January 2013.

Top Girls Fassa Bortolo

Ages as of 1 January 2013.

Topsport Vlaanderen–Bioracer

Ages as of 1 January 2013.

Vaiano Fondriest

Ages as of 1 January 2013.

Vienne Futuroscope

Ages as of 1 January 2013.

Wiggle–Honda

References

2013 in women's road cycling
2013